Park or Bak, is the third-most-common surname in Korea, traditionally traced back to 1st century King Hyeokgeose Park and theoretically inclusive of all of his descendants. Park or Bak is usually assumed to come from the Korean noun Bak, meaning "gourd". As of the South Korean census of 2015, there were 4,192,074 people with the name in South Korea, or roughly 8.4% of the population.

Founding legend
All the Park clans in Korea trace their ancestry back to the first king of Silla, Hyeokgeose. According to a legend, the leaders of the six clans of the Jinhan confederacy were gathering on a hilltop to choose a king, when they looked down and saw lightning strike at the foot of the Yangsan mountain and a white horse bow at the same place. When they went there to check, they found a red egg, which hatched a baby boy. They bathed the boy in the nearby stream and he was emitting bright light and the sun and the moon rose at the same time, indicating the divine birth of the child. Thus the child was named Hyeokgeose, meaning "ruling with a bright light" and his clan name became Bak or "gourd" after the round shape of the egg he hatched from. At age 13 he was given the title geoseogan (거서간), the equivalent of "king" at the time. The birth legends of early Korean kings were necessary to validate the "divine" nature of their rule.

Clans

As with other Korean surnames, different lineages, known as bon-gwan or clans, are inherited from a father by his children. These designate the region of Korea or paternal ancestor, from which they claim to originate. Out of the kings of Silla, ten had the Park surname. During the rule of King Pasa (80–112), the Park clans became divided and during the reign of King Gyeongmyeong (917–924) they became even more fractured, creating several lineages. This is when the nine Park clans named after the nine sons of Gyeongmyeong came into existence.

70–80% of the current bearers of the surname belong to the Miryang Bak clan. In 2015, there were 314 Bak clans in South Korea, with about 4.19 million people altogether.

The clans which produced the most number of notable people in Korean history are collectively called the "8 Parks", these are: the Miryang Park clan (밀양박씨), the Bannam Park clan (반남박씨), the Goryeong Park clan (고령박씨), the Hamyang Park clan (함양박씨), the Juksan Park clan (죽산박씨), the Suncheon Park clan (순천박씨), the Muan Park clan (무안박씨) and the Chungju Park clan (충주박씨).

Marriage within a clan
Traditionally, a man and a woman in the same clan could not marry, so the combination of the bon-gwan and the family name of a husband had to differ from those of his wife. Until 1997, this was also the law, but this was ruled unconstitutional.

Position in society

King Hyeokgeose was said to have founded the Korean kingdom of Silla at the age of thirteen in 57 BC. Bak was one of three houses of the Korean kingdom of Silla. Among the houses of Bak, Gim, and Seok, princes rotated on the throne of Silla. According to historical records, all three houses have been recorded as having worshipped the founding father, Bak Hyeokgeose as their ancestral shrine. For example, the 4th king Talhae of Silla, the 9th king Beolhyu of Silla, the 10th king Naehae of Silla, the 11th king Jobun of Silla, the 12th king Cheomhae of Silla, the 14th King Yurye of Silla and the 15th king Girim of Silla were house of Seok, but according to the Samguk sagi Silla bongi, all of them worshipped Bak Hyeokgeose as their progenitor. In addition, the 13th king Michu of Silla, the 16th king Heulhae of Silla, the 17th king Naemul of Silla, the 18th king Silseong of Silla, the 19th king Nulji of Silla, the 20th king Jabi of Silla, the 21st king Soji of Silla, the 22nd king Jijeung of Silla, the 40th king Aejang of Silla, the 41st king Heondeok of Silla and the 42nd king Heungdeok of Silla are descendants of Gim Al-ji, but according to the Samguk sagi Silla bongi, all of them worshipped Bak Hyeokgeose as their progenitor. In addition, according to Samguk sagi, the Shrine Shingung(神宮) was founded in the birthplace of the progenitor Bak Hyeokgeose(朴赫居世) and every king has been recorded as paying their respects at this shrine. All of these historical records imply that the three lineages of Bak, Seok, and Gim worshipped Bak Hyeokgeose as their founding ancestor.

When Seonggols have died out followed by two consecutive queens, Kim Chun-Chu from Jingol began to monopolize the throne, which lasts 258 years. However, even during this period, the Kims did not fully occupy the throne. In the later period of Silla, the Bak clan from Jingol succeed in restoring the throne. During the last century of the dynasty, the Bak clan from Jingol regained the ruling house position in 728 years. However, the Bak dynasty was cut off when Gyeongae of Silla was forced to commit suicide by Gyeon Hwon of the Hubaekje Kingdom. The reign of the Bak clan lasted only 15 years. After that, Gim Bu became the last king of Silla, but soon surrendered to the Wang Geon of Goryeo and Silla finally collapsed in 992 years.

During the Unified Silla the Miryang Bak Clan, along with Gimhae Gim clan became the most prominent of the aristocracy, based on the bone rank system. Within the bone rank system, the two clans of Gimhae Gims and Miryang Baks were considered the most Jingol, or "True Bone". As Seong gol, or Divine bones died out through intermarriage, these two clans became the dominant noble houses on the peninsula following the conquest of rival dynasties.

After the fall of Silla, it continued as a major noble house of Goryeo. During the Goryeo dynasty, many of the people who passed the highest-level state examination, which was implemented to recruit ranking officials during the Goryeo dynasty, were Parks. The first General to defeat the Mongols in world history was General Park Seo, who commanded the successful defense of the fortress of Guju in 1231 against the forces led by Mongol General Sartaq.

During Joseon dynasty, Parks continued to thrive as one of the main Yangban households. With the Gabo Reform of 1894, when the caste system was abolished, some peasants adopted the surname of Park, bloating the population of the Park family. Simultaneously with the abolition of the Gwageo national service examination, the Yangban system came to an end. During the Japanese Occupation Period, three of the ten Korean aristocrats admitted into Japanese House of Peers were of the Park Clan.

Notable people of the past 
The following is a list of notable people of the past with the Korean family name Park/Bak. People should only be included in this list if they have their own Wikipedia articles or if they are discussed in a non-trivial fashion in Wikipedia articles on notable groups or events with which they are associated.

Kings
Kings of Silla in order of their reign:
 King Hyeokgeose of Silla (57 BC – 4 AD)
 King Namhae of Silla (4–24)
 King Yuri of Silla (24–57)
 King Pasa of Silla (80–112)
 King Jima of Silla (112–134)
 King Ilseong of Silla (134–154)
 King Adalla of Silla (154–184)
 King Sindeok of Silla (912–917)
 King Gyeongmyeong of Silla (917–924)
 King Gyeongae of Silla (924–927)

Historical people
 General Park Seo (Defeated the Mongol Army of Sartak at Battle of Kusong 1231)
 Park Soon :ko:박순 (고려) (?-1402). Military subordinate to Taejo of Joseon. Accompanied Taejo in all military campaigns from the anti-Japanese pirate campaigns in the south to Liaodong invasion of 1388. Personally delivered the message of Redeployment from Wihwado to King Ui of Goryeo in behalf of Taejo. Was appointed the high commander of Joseon Army following the founding of the dynasty. Killed during the Northeastern Rebellion of 1398 :ko:조사의의 난
Pak Paeng-nyeon (1417–1456) was a scholar-official of the early Joseon Dynasty, and is known as one of the six martyred ministers. He was born to a yangban family of the Suncheon Pak lineage, and was the son of high minister Pak Jeongrim.  He joined in a plot to overthrow Sejo and restore Danjong in 1456, but the plot was uncovered through the betrayal of fellow plotter Kim Jil. Sejo admired Pak's abilities and offered to pardon him if he were to deny his involvement and acknowledge Sejo as his king. Park died in prison from torture. Revered as a model of Confucian Loyalty. Alone among the six martyred ministers to have a surviving male descendant. One of his female servant passed off his youngest son as her own, thereby ensuring the family name.  All other family and relatives were executed.
Park Joong Seon :ko:박중선 (1435–1481) Passed the National Military Service Exam with the highest score in 1460 at the age of 35. Held in high esteem by the new King Sejo for his excellent riding and archery skills, frequently accompanying the king as his personal body guard on hunts. Married off his daughter to the Crown Prince in 1366, becoming an in-law of the King. In 1367, appointed a Provincial General to put down the Northeastern Rebellion, earning further accolades becoming the youngest Minister of Defense in Joseon history.
Park Jin (1560–1597) Served in the military intelligence following his passing of the national military service exam. Transferred to Infantry 4 years before the Japanese Invasion of 1592. Defeated by the Japanese at the Battle of Miryang (Clan home), before regaining his honor in follow on victories, including the battle of Yeongcheon and the Second Battle of Gyeongju. Was instrumental in convincing Sayaga, the highest ranking Samurai General of the invasion force to surrender. In 1597, near the end of the war, a Ming Chinese General 누승선(婁承先) accused him falsely of disobeying official order, tortured him, resulting in his death. Korean investigators confirmed broken ribs and sternum on his body.
Park Yeon (박연) (1595– after 1666). Jan Janse de Weltevree, after his 1627 shipwreck, was drowned to Jeju Island and was not allowed to leave Korea. Thus he adopted a Korean name.
Pak Jega (1750–1815) was a Korean Scholar of Practical Learning Silhak who advocated modern commercial reformation for Joseon dynasty after visiting China on official capacity. A strong critic of the Confucian scholars first mentality, he was banished to the provinces in 1805.
Park Gyu-su 박규수 (1807–1877). He passed the national service exam in 1848, and as an inspector, put down the 1862 Peasant Rebellion in Jinju, reducing the tax burden and punishing the corrupt official of the city. As the Inspector General of Pyeong An Province in 1866, when USS General Sherman General Sherman Incident made its expedition into Pyeong Yang, ordered the attack on the ship when the sailors began attacking and looting the populace, resulting in the burning and sinking of the ship. Also a geographer, cartographer, and poet in the classical style. Became a notable member of the modernization movement in late Joseon until his death in 1877.
 Park Jeong Yang :ko:박정양 (1842–1905) was the First Ambassador of Joseon to the United States in 1887, and a member of Kim Hong Jip cabinet.

Notable people of the recent times

Actors
Park Bo-gum
Park Jin-young
Park Geun-hyung
Park In-hwan
Park Hae-il
Park Hae-jin
Randall Park
Park Yong-ha
Park Yu-hwan
Park Seo-joon
Park Shin-yang
Park Sang Min
Park Hyung-sik

Actresses
Park Won-sook
Park Min-young
Park Han-byul
Park Hee-jung
Park Hwan-hee
Park Eun-hye
Park Si-yeon
Grace Park
Hettienne Park
Soo Ae
Park Shin-hye
Linda Park
Park Bo-young
Park Eun-bin
Park Jung-ah
Park Min-ha
Park Si-eun (1980)
Park Sol-mi
Park Yoo-chun
Sydney Park
Park Hye-su
Park Yoo-na

Athletes
Dong Keun Park, Grandmaster of Taekwondo 
Inbee Park (born 1988), South Korean golfer
Park Byung-geon (born 1982), footballer 
Angela Park (born 1988), Brazilian-American golfer of Korean descent
Hoy Park (born 1996), South Korean baseball player
Jane Park (born 1986), American golfer of Korean descent
Park Hang-seo (born 1957), South Korean football manager for Vietnam national football team
Park Ji-Sung (born 1981), South Korean footballer
Park Joo-Young (born 1985), South Korean footballer
Park Chan-Ho (born 1973), South Korean baseball player
Park Hyung-guen (born 1985), footballer 
Park Jong-il (born 1972), South Korean ski mountaineer
Park Jong Soo (born 1941), Taekwondo master
Pak Se-Ri (born 1977), South Korean golfer
Park Tae-Hwan (born 1989), South Korean swimmer
Park Joo Bong (born 1964), South Korean badminton player
 Piao Cheng (born 1989), Korean-Chinese football player
Park Sang-young (born 1995), South Korean épée fencer
Park Seung-hi (born 1992), South Korean short track speed skater
Park Sung-hyun (golfer) (born 1993), South Korean golfer
Park Sung-hoon (figure skater) (born 2002), former South Korean figure skater, member of South Korean boy band Enhypen
Park Joo-ho (born 1987), a South Korean football player for Suwon FC team

Comedians

Park Kyung-lim

Directors
Annabel Park, American documentary filmmaker and activist
Park Chan-wook, South Korean director
Park Nam-ok, first Korean woman director
Sunghoo Park, South Korean-born anime director

Literary figures
Park Chong-hwa, Korean novelist
Park Hyoung-su, Korean novelist
Park In-hwan, Korean author
 Park Jaesam, Korean poet
 Park Nam-su, Korean poet
 Park Taesun, Korean novelist
 Park Taewon, Korean novelist
Park Wan-suh, Korean novelist
 Park Yeonghan, Korean author
 Park Yong-rae, Korean author
 Park Ynhui, Korean poet and writer

Politicians
Park Chung-hee (1917-1979), former President of South Korea
Park Geun-hye (born 1952), former President of South Korea, daughter of Park Chung-hee
Park Ji-won (born 1942), South Korean politician
Jihyun Park (born 1968), North Korean refugee and British politician and writer
Pak Song-chol (1913–2008), North Korean politician
Park Won-soon (1956–2020), South Korean politician, philanthropist, activist and lawyer

Singers

Park Bom, former member of South Korean girl group 2NE1
Park Bo-ram, South Korean singer
Brandon Paak Anderson, also known as Anderson .Paak, American rapper and musician
Park Chanyeol, member of South Korean-Chinese boy band Exo
Park Choong-jae (stage name Jun Jin), member of South Korean boy group Shinhwa
Park Cho-a, former member of South Korean girl group AOA
Park Cho-rong, member of South Korean girl group Apink
Park Eun-hye (stage name Ivy), South Korean singer
Park Gyu-ri, former member of South Korean girl group Kara
Park Hyo-jin (stage name Narsha), member of South Korean girl group Brown Eyed Girls
Park Hyo-shin, South Korean singer
Park Hyung-sik, actor, singer and member of South Korean boy group ZE:A
Park Jae-bum (stage name Jay Park), Korean American singer, rapper, and dancer; former member of South Korean boy group 2PM
 Park Jae-chan, member of South Korean boy group DKZ
Park Jae-hyung (stage name Jae), Korean-American singer and lead guitarist of South Korean rock band Day6
Park Jae-sang (stage name Psy), South Korean singer and rapper
Park Ji-hoon, member of South Korean boy group Wanna One and soloist
Park Ji-hoon (stage name Jihoon), leader and member of South Korean boy group Treasure
Park Ji-min, member of South Korean singing duo 15&, also known as Jamie Park
Park Jimin (stage name Jimin), member of South Korean boy group BTS
Park Jin-woo (stage name Jinjin), member and leader of South Korean boy group Astro
Park Jin-young (stage name Jinyoung; formerly Jr.), member of South Korean boy group Got7 and its subgroup JJ Project
Park Jin-young (stage names J.Y. Park, The Asiansoul, and JYP), South Korean singer-songwriter; founder and CEO of JYP Entertainment
Park Ji-hyo, member and leader of South Korean girl group Twice
Park Ji-yeon, member of South Korean girl group T-ara
Park Ji-yeon (stage name Gummy), South Korean singer
Park Ji-yoon, South Korean singer
Park Ji-young (stage name Kahi), former member of South Korean girl group After School
Park Joon-hyung, member of South Korean boy group g.o.d
Park Jun-young, South Korean rapper, member of South Korean hip hop group MFBTY
Park Jung-ah, former member of South Korean girl group Jewelry
Park Jeong-hwa, member of South Korean girl group EXID
Lena Park (born Park Junghyun), Korean-American singer
Park Jung-Min, member of South Korean boy group SS501
Park Jeong-su (stage name Leeteuk), member of South Korean boy group Super Junior
Park Kyung, member of South Korean hip-hop boy group Block B
Park Min-hyuk (stage name Rocky), member of South Korean boy band Astro
Park Myung-soo, South Korean singer and comedian
Roseanne Park (stage name Rosé; Korean name Park Chae-young), member of South Korean girl group Blackpink
Sandara Park (stage name Dara), singer who rose to fame in South Korea and the Philippines; former member of South Korean girl group 2NE1
Park Sang Hyun (stage name Thunder), singer, rapper, former member of South Korean boy band MBLAQ
Park Si-eun, actress, singer, and member of STAYC
Park Yu-hyang (stage name Shion), Korean Japanese R&B singer
Park Sojin, member of South Korean girl group Girl's Day
Park Soo-young (stage name: Park Soo-ah; former stage name: Lizzy), former member of South Korean girl group After School
Park Soo-young (stage name Joy), member of South Korean girl group Red Velvet
Park Subin, member of South Korean girl group Dal Shabet
Sun Park, Australian-Korean entertainer and former member of Australian musical group Hi-5
Park Sun-young (stage name Luna), member of South Korean girl group f(x)
Teddy Park, member of South Korean hip-hop group 1TYM
Park Woo-jin, former member of South Korean boy group Wanna One and member of AB6IX
Park Ye-eun, former member of South Korean girl group Wonder Girls
Park Yoo-chun, former member of South Korean boy group TVXQ, member of South Korean boy group JYJ
Park Sung-hoon, member of South Korean boy group Enhypen

Soldiers
 General Park Jong Heon (Chief of Staff, Republic of Korea Air Force, 2010–2012)

Voice actors
Romi Park

Other
 Park Hye-min (born 1990), South Korean beauty vlogger and make-up artist
 Park Jeong-hwan (born 1993), South Korean professional Go player 
 Park Kun-bae (born 1948)
 Sae Eun Park (born 1989), South Korean ballet dancer
 Park Young-sook (born 1955), Futurist; Founder of the Korea Foster Care Association
 Piao Wenyao (born 1988), Chinese professional Go player
 Suji Park (born 1985), Korean-New Zealand ceramic sculptor and artist

Fictional characters
Adam Park, a character on Mighty Morphin Power Rangers
Park, a character on Hey Arnold!
Linda Park, a character in the Flash series of comics from DC Comics
 Sun Park, a character on American Dragon: Jake Long
 Park Sheridan, a book character from the Novel, Eleanor and Park by Rainbow Rowell
 Glory Park, a book character from the novel Every Anxious Wave by Mo Daviau
 Soojin Park, a character in Hena Khan's novel Amina's Voice
 Chloe Park, a character on We Bare Bears
 Jake Park, one of the survivors from the action-horror video game Dead by Daylight
 Willow Park, a character in The Owl House

See also 

 Korean name
 Silla
 Royal House

References

Korean-language surnames
Lists of Korean people
Lists of people by surname
50s BC establishments
57 BC
 
Surnames of Korean origin